"Clumsy" is a song by Canadian alternative rock band Our Lady Peace. It was released in 1997 as the second single from their second album, Clumsy. It is one of the band's most successful singles, reaching number one in Canada for three weeks. It also experienced success in the United States, reaching number five on the Billboard Modern Rock Tracks chart and staying in the top ten for 15 weeks. The song ranked number one on CILQ-FM's Top 107 songs of 1997.

"Clumsy" has become a staple in Our Lady Peace's live setlist. A live version of the song is featured on their first live compilation Live released in 2003. The song was included on the soundtrack to the 1997 movie I Know What You Did Last Summer.

Track listings

Canadian CD single and European CD1 
 "Clumsy" – 4:28
 "Superman's Dead" (acoustic) – 4:09

European CD2 
 "Clumsy" – 4:28
 "Clumsy" (power acoustic) – 4:00
 "Superman's Dead" (acoustic) – 4:09

Australian CD single 
 "Clumsy"
 "Let You Down"
 "Starseed"
 "Hope"

Charts

Weekly charts

Year-end charts

Release history

References

External links
 

1997 singles
1997 songs
Columbia Records singles
Epic Records singles
Our Lady Peace songs
RPM Top Singles number-one singles
Songs written by Arnold Lanni
Songs written by Raine Maida